This is a '''list of historic houses in Denmark

Copenhagen

Zealand

Faxe Municipality

Holbæk Municipality

Kalundborg Municipality

Lejre Municipality

Næstved Municipality

Odsherred Municipality

Ringsted Municipality

Slagelse Municipality

Sorø Municipality

Stevns Municipality

Vordingborg Municipality

Bornholm

Lolland-Falster

Guldborgsund Municipality

Lolland Municipality

Funen and South Funen Archipelago

Assens Municipality

Faaborg-Midtfyn Municipality

Kerteminde Municipality

Langeland Municipality

Middelfart Municipality

Nordfyn Municipality

Nyborg Municipality

Odense Municipality

Svendborg Municipality

South Jutland

Aabenraa Municipality

Haderslev Municipality

Kolding Municipality

Sønderborg Municipality

Tønder Municipality

Varde Municipality

Vejle Municipality

East Jutland and Samsø

Aarhus Municipality

Favrskov Municipality

Horsens Municipality

Norddjurs Municipality

Silkeborg Municipality

Syddjurs Municipality

Mid-West Jutland and Læsø

Holstebro Municipality

Ringkøbing-Skjern Municipality

Skive Municipality

Viborg Municipality

North Jutland

Aalborg Municipality

Brønderslev Municipality

Frederikshavn Municipality

Hjørring Municipality

Jammerbugt Municipality

Læsø Municipality

Rebild Municipality

Thisted Municipality

Vesthimmerland Municipality

 
Historic houses
Historic houses